The Seoul Open Challenger is a tournament for professional tennis players played on outdoor hard courts. The event is classified as a $100,000 ATP Challenger event and a $50,000 ITF Women's Circuit tournament and has been held in Seoul, South Korea, annually, since 2014.

Men's Champions

Singles

Doubles

Women's Champions

Singles

Doubles

External links 
 ITF search

 
ATP Challenger Tour
ITF Women's World Tennis Tour
Tennis tournaments in South Korea
Hard court tennis tournaments
Recurring sporting events established in 2014